In the Kitchen with Stefano Faita is a Canadian television cooking show, which aired from 2011 to 2014 on CBC Television. Hosted by Montreal chef and restaurateur Stefano Faita, the show featured Faita demonstrating recipes, predominantly but not exclusively associated with Italian and Québécois cuisines.

The show was taped in front of a live studio audience.

The show's cancellation was announced in March 2014, amid budget cuts at the CBC. Repeats continued to air on CBC Television, OUTtv and Telelatino.

References

External links
Official website on Archive (website valid until December 26th, 2016)
TLN

2011 Canadian television series debuts
CBC Television original programming
2010s Canadian cooking television series
2014 Canadian television series endings